Fomitopsis cajanderi is a widely distributed bracket fungus. Commonly known as the rosy conk due to its rose-colored pore surface, it causes a disease called a brown pocket rot in various conifer species. It is inedible. It is widespread in Western North America, with more prevalence in southern climates. It has a particular preference for higher-altitude spruce forests.

Identification 
F. cajanderi is a perennial shelf fungus. It may be identified by its small-to-medium-sized, fleshy, tough fruit-body, with a downy or crust-like top. The top surface is a pink colour becoming to grey, brown, or black, with a clear margin. The inside of the conk and the bottom are a rosy pink colour. The body of the fungus is rigid and can grow up to 1 cm thick. There are 3–5 round pores per millimeter.

This polypore is morphologically similar to its relative, Fomitopsis rosea. Other similar species include Fomitopsis pinicola, Ganoderma lucidum, G. oregonense, and Oligoporus placentus.

See also
 List of apricot diseases
 List of peach and nectarine diseases
 List of Douglas-fir diseases

References

Fungi described in 1904
Fungal tree pathogens and diseases
Inedible fungi
Stone fruit tree diseases
cajanderi
Taxa named by Petter Adolf Karsten